Elm Hill may refer to:
Elm Hill, New Brunswick, the last surviving black community in New Brunswick
Elm Hill, Norwich, United Kingdom, an historic cobbled lane with buildings dating back to the Tudor ages
Elm Hill (Newport, Tennessee), listed on the National Register of Historic Places in Cocke County, Tennessee
Elm Hill (Baskerville, Virginia), listed on the National Register of Historic Places in Mecklenburg County, Virginia
Elm Hill (Wheeling, West Virginia), listed on the National Register of Historic Places in Ohio County, West Virginia